The Miami Fort Generating Station is a dual-fuel power generating facility. It is a major coal-fired electrical power station, supplemented with a small oil-fired facility. Miami Fort is located in Miami Township, Hamilton County, immediately east of the tripoint of Indiana, Kentucky, and Ohio. Miami Fort Station is named for the nearby Miami Fort (not to be confused with Fort Miami in the same state).

Units and ownership
A cooling tower was commissioned in the 1970s by Cincinnati Gas and Electric Company (CG&E), a forerunner of Duke Energy, in order to meet pollution control mandates set by the State of Ohio. Unit 5 was permanently shut down in 2010. Unit 6 ceased coal generation on June 1, 2015. The plant used to be co-owned by Duke Energy and Dayton Power & Light (DP&L). In August 2014, Duke Energy sold its stake in both the coal and oil facilities to Dynegy. DP&L continued to own its remaining share of ownership until 2017 when it sold its stake to Dynegy.

Environmental impact
With its oldest unit dating back to late 1940s, the plant was ranked 36th on the United States list of dirtiest power plants in terms of sulphur dioxide emissions per megawatt-hour of electrical energy produced in 2006.

Retirement
In September 2020, Vistra announced its plans to retire the power station by year-end 2027 or earlier.

See also

 List of power stations in Ohio

References

External links 
 Miami Fort monthly data from the Energy Information Administration Electricity data browser

Energy infrastructure completed in 1949
Energy infrastructure completed in 1960
Energy infrastructure completed in 1971
Energy infrastructure completed in 1975
Energy infrastructure completed in 1978
Buildings and structures in Hamilton County, Ohio
Coal-fired power stations in Ohio
Vistra Corp